Arditi is the name adopted by the Italian Army elite storm troops of World War I. 

Arditi may also refer to:

 Arditi (surname)
 Arditi del Popolo ("People's Squads"), an Italian militant anti-fascist group
 A former name of the 9th Parachute Assault Regiment of the Italian Army
 Arditi (band), a Swedish martial industrial and neoclassical band

See also
Arditti, a surname